The Victors (German: Die Sieger) is a 1918 German silent drama film directed by Rudolf Biebrach and starring Henny Porten, Arthur Bergen and Bruno Decarli.

The film's sets were designed by the art director Jack Winter.

Cast
 Henny Porten as Konstanze Assing 
 Arthur Bergen as Camille Düpaty 
 Bruno Decarli as Siegmund Freystetter 
 Rudolf Biebrach as Musikprofessor Assing 
 Paul Biensfeldt as Buchbindermeister Gerum 
 Elsa Wagner as Frau Freystetter

References

Bibliography
 Hans-Michael Bock & Michael Töteberg. Das Ufa-Buch. Zweitausendeins, 1992.

External links
 

1918 films
Films of the German Empire
German silent feature films
Films directed by Rudolf Biebrach
German drama films
1918 drama films
UFA GmbH films
German black-and-white films
Films about opera
Films about composers
Silent drama films
1910s German films